Bráulio Barbosa de Lima (born August 4, 1948 in Porto Alegre) is a Brazilian former footballer who played as a midfielder.

Bráulio appeared in 165 Campeonato Brasileiro matches during his career, playing for Internacional, América (RJ), Botafogo and Coritiba.

Clubs
 Internacional: 1965–1974
 América (RJ): 1974–1976
 Botafogo: 1977–1978
 Coritiba: 1979–1979
 Universidad de Chile: 1980–1981

References

 

Living people
1948 births
Sportspeople from Rio Grande do Sul
Brazilian footballers
Association football midfielders
Sport Club Internacional players
Botafogo de Futebol e Regatas players
America Football Club (RJ) players
Coritiba Foot Ball Club players
Universidad de Chile footballers
Chilean Primera División players
Brazilian expatriate footballers
Brazilian expatriate sportspeople in Chile
Expatriate footballers in Chile